Great Strickland is a civil parish in the Eden District, Cumbria, England.  It contains 17 listed buildings that are recorded in the National Heritage List for England.  All the listed buildings are designated at Grade II, the lowest of the three grades, which is applied to "buildings of national importance and special interest".  The parish contains the village of Great Strickland and the surrounding countryside.  Almost all the listed building are houses, farmhouses or farm buildings, the others being a church and a limekiln.


Buildings

Notes and references

Notes

Citations

Sources

Lists of listed buildings in Cumbria